Mount Coley is a mountain,  high, standing  south of Mount Frost, in the Churchill Mountains. It was named by the Advisory Committee on Antarctic Names for Commander Vernon J. Coley, commanding officer of U.S. Navy Squadron VX-6 in Antarctica, 1957–58.

References 

Mountains of Oates Land